Eulepidotis caeruleilinea is a moth of the family Erebidae first described by Francis Walker in 1858. It is found in the Neotropical realm, including French Guiana, Costa Rica and the Brazilian states of Amazonas and Rio de Janeiro.

References

Moths described in 1858
caeruleilinea